I Travel Alone is a 2011 Norwegian drama film directed by Stian Kristiansen. It is a sequel to The Man Who Loved Yngve from 2008 and was followed by the prequel The Orheim Company in 2012.

Plot 
Jarle Klepp is 25-year-old literature student (onomastic, Marcel Proust) at the University of Bergen in Norway. He suddenly discovers he has a 7-year-old daughter, when the mother (with whom he once had a one-night stand) sends her to him to take care for her for a week. He struggles with his new role, loses his girlfriend to his teacher and gets again close to the mother during a costume party for the children.

External links 

2011 films
Norwegian drama films
2011 drama films